Jagataren Devi Sudin is a Nepalese politician who is elected member of Provincial Assembly of Madhesh Province from CPN (Unified Marxist–Leninist). Sudin is a resident of Naraha Rural Municipality, Siraha.

References

External links

Living people
Members of the Provincial Assembly of Madhesh Province
People from Siraha District
Communist Party of Nepal (Unified Marxist–Leninist) politicians
Year of birth missing (living people)